The Hotel Savoy Moscow is a historic hotel in Moscow, opened in 1913. The symbol of the hotel is a salamander.

Location
, at 3/6, b.1, Rozhdestvenka, Moscow, 109012, Russia.

History
The Savoy Hotel opened on March 30, 1913. It was built to host tourists visiting Russia for the Romanov tercentenary, a huge celebration of 300 years of Russian imperial rule in May 1913. In 1959, in honor of the 10th anniversary of the German Democratic Republic, the hotel was renamed Hotel Berlin.

In 1987, the hotel closed for a $16 million restoration, funded by INFA, a joint venture between Intourist, the Soviet state tourism monopoly, and Finnair, which reserved 80% of the rooms for its own passengers. It reopened on October 3, 1989, under its original name, as the Hotel Savoy Moscow. The luxury hotel was aimed exclusively at wealthy Western guests. Like most other luxury hotels in Moscow at the time, it did not accept Rubles, but unlike others, it did not accept western hard currency cash either. Instead, the Savoy required that all payments be made with credit cards, to cut down on corruption. Among its amenities was a casino, operated by another Finnish firm, Casino Amherst International Ltd. In 2005, the Savoy was renovated, at a cost of $20 million.

Current ownership
The hotel is owned by OAO Infa-Otel, whose stock is shared between Musgrave Holdings (84%), a member of the Guta Group, and the government of Moscow (16%).

References

External links
 Official website

Hotels in Moscow
Companies nationalised by the Soviet Union
Hotel buildings completed in 1913
Hotels established in 1913
Hotels established in 1989